Eurycnema versirubra, the red-winged green giant stick insect, is a species of stick insect from Timor, Solor and Wetar Islands, Java, Sumatra, Southeast Borneo, Peninsular Malaysia, Singapore, and Thailand. The original habitat of Eurycnema versirubra is suspected to be Timor, probably brought from there to Java and Malaysia for captivity purposes, because there are no known records of the species existing there.

Description
Females are large, winged, and green in color. Both sexes from Timor have a striking red coloration on the inside costal region of the hindwings and forewings.

Additional images

References

Phasmatodea